Dreamland is an upcoming British comedy television series based on Sharon Horgan's 2017 Sky Arts short Morgana Robinson's Summer. It will premiere in April 2023.

Cast
 Freema Agyeman as Trish
 Lily Allen as Mel
 Kiell Smith-Bynoe
 Gabby Best as Clare
 Aimee-Ffion Edwards as Leila
 Frances Barber
 Sheila Reid as Nan
 Samantha Bond
 Hugh Coles

Production

Development
A television adaptation of Horgan's short Morgana Robinson's Summer was in development as of July 2019. Ellie Heydon served as lead director. Dreamland is produced by Horgan and Celia Mountford's Merman Films in association with Sky Studios. Jane Bell would produce, Alex Moody of Sky would executive produce, and Emma Jane Unsworth was named showrunner and associate producer. Gabby Best, Sharma Walfall and Sarah Kendall joined Unsworth in the writers' room.

In June 2022, it was revealed Lily Allen would make her television debut in Dreamland. The following month, Freema Agyeman was announced as Allen's co-lead. Gabby Best, Aimee-Ffion Edwards, and Frances Barber would reprise their roles from Morgana Robinson's Summer. Also joining the cast were Kiell Smith-Bynoe and Sheila Reid; Samantha Bond would guest star.

Principal photography began on location in Margate, Kent in summer 2022. Allen was spotted on set in July. Filming also took place in London.

References

External links
 

Upcoming comedy television series
2023 British television series debuts
2020s British sitcoms
Pregnancy-themed television shows
Sky sitcoms
English-language television shows
Television shows set in Kent
Television shows shot in Kent